Lea Barkus (born 7 December 1974) is an English former footballer who played as forward for Reading and Fulham. He was forced to retire from the professional game at just 22 due to a persistent back injury.

Career 
Born in Reading, Barkus began his career in the Youth Training Scheme at his hometown club. After progressing through the youth teams, he made his first team debut in March 1992 age 17 against Chester City and was awarded man-of-the match for his performance. A few weeks later he scored his first goal in the 6–1 win over Torquay United though soon after he began to suffer from persistent back problems. He made a further 11 appearances during the 1992–93 season but failed to add to his goal tally and never made another appearance for the first team, though he was part of the Reading reserve side that won the Berks & Bucks Senior Cup in 1994.

Although he had not played for the Reading first team since the 1992–93 season, and with his back problems to continue to hamper him despite surgery, Barkus joined Fulham for £20,000 in 1995. He made 16 appearances during the 1995–96 season, scoring twice, but did not feature again and in 1997 was forced to retire as a professional due to his back problems. He moved into non-league football and then coaching. As of the 2013–14 season he is a youth coach with East Berkshire Football League side Bracknell Cavaliers. In April 2021 Lea was appointed interim manager of Combined Counties side Sandhurst Town.

Career statistics

Honours 
Berks & Bucks Senior Cup: 1994

References 

1974 births
Living people
Sportspeople from Reading, Berkshire
English footballers
Association football forwards
Reading F.C. players
Fulham F.C. players
English Football League players
Footballers from Berkshire